A Zin Latt (also known as Kay Kay (or) Kay Zin Latt; born 18 January 1981) is a Burmese politician and physician currently serving as a Pyithu Hluttaw MP for Shwebo constituency. She is a member of the National League for Democracy.

Early life and education
Latt was born on 18 January 1981 in Kanbalu Township, Myanmar. She graduated with M.B.B.S from University of Medicine, Mandalay. Her previous job is doctor.

Political career
She is a member of the National League for Democracy. In the 2015 Myanmar general election, she was elected as a Pyithu Hluttaw MP and elected representative from Shwebo constituency.

References

National League for Democracy politicians
1981 births
Living people
People from Sagaing Region
21st-century Burmese women politicians
21st-century Burmese politicians
Members of Pyithu Hluttaw